Discovery Studio is a suite of software for simulating small molecule and macromolecule systems.  It is developed and distributed by Dassault Systemes BIOVIA (formerly Accelrys).

The product suite has a strong academic collaboration programme, supporting scientific research and makes use of a number of software algorithms developed originally in the scientific community, including CHARMM, MODELLER, DELPHI, ZDOCK, DMol3 and more.

Scope 
Discovery Studio provides software applications covering the following areas:
 Simulations
 Including Molecular Mechanics, Molecular Dynamics, Quantum Mechanics
 For molecular mechanics based simulations:  Include implicit and explicit-based solvent models and membrane models
 Also includes the ability to perform hybrid QM/MM calculations
 Ligand Design
 Including tools for enumerating molecular libraries and library optimization
 Pharmacophore modeling
 Including creation, validation and virtual screening
 Structure-based Design
 Including tools for fragment-based placement and refinement, receptor-ligand docking and pose refinement, de novo design
 Macromolecule design and validation
 Macromolecule engineering
 Specialist tools for protein-protein docking
 Specialist tools for Antibody design and optimization
 Specialist tools for membrane-bound proteins, including GPCRs
 QSAR
 Covering methods such as multiple linear regression, partial least squares, recursive partitioning, Genetic Function approximation and 3D field-based QSAR
 ADME
 Predictive toxicity

See also
 Molecular Mechanics Programs
 Quantum Mechanics Software
 Molecular Modeling
 Molecular Design Software
 Protein homology modeling
 MDL Chime

External links
 Accelrys.com
 Discovery Studio
 Supporting free software tools:  Discovery Studio Visualizer and ActiveX Controls

Recent News Articles
 BioIT World News article on Discovery Studio
 BioInform (GenomeWeb)

References

Computational chemistry software
Science software